Island Plantation is a rural locality in the Fraser Coast Region, Queensland, Australia.

History 
A Bapist Church opened at "The Island" on the weekend of 8-9 September 1906.

Following the closure of the school in neighbouring St Helens in December 1941, in May 1942 the Island Farmer's Association offered their hall to establish a school in Island Plantation for the duration of the war. Gladys Rose Walter was transferred to the school in June 1942 as its teacher. Island Plantation Provisional School opened in 1942 and closed in 1944.

Geography
The Mary River forms the eastern boundary.

References 

Fraser Coast Region
Localities in Queensland